The 1998–99 Southwest Missouri State Bears basketball team represented Southwest Missouri State University in National Collegiate Athletic Association (NCAA) Division I men's basketball during the 1998–99 season. Playing in the Missouri Valley Conference and led by head coach Steve Alford, the Bears finished the season with a 22–11 overall record (11–7 MVC). As the No. 12 seed in the East region, Southwest Missouri State made a run to the Sweet Sixteen of the NCAA tournament.

Roster

Schedule and results

|-
!colspan=9 style=| Regular season

|-
!colspan=9 style=| MVC tournament

|-
!colspan=9 style=| NCAA tournament

References

Missouri State Bears basketball seasons
Southwest Missouri State
Missouri State Bears Basketball Team
Missouri State Bears Basketball Team
Southwest Missouri State